The 1932 Southern Conference football season was the college football games played by the member schools of the Southern Conference as part of the 1932 college football season. The season began on September 17.

This is the last season before many teams leave to form the Southeastern Conference, which still exists today.

Regular season

SoCon teams in bold.

Week One

Week Two

Week Three

Week Four

Week Five

Week Six

Week Seven

Week Eight

Week Nine

Week Ten

Week Eleven

Week Twelve

Week Fourteen

Awards and honors

All-Americans

E – David Ariail, Auburn (NEA-2; CP-1)
E – Virgil Rayburn, Tennessee (NYS-2)
T – Fred Crawford, Duke (AP-2; UP-2; CP-3)
G – Thomas Hupke, Alabama (CP-2)
C – Pete Gracey, Vanderbilt (AP-2; UP-1; NEA-2; INS-2; NYS-2; NYT-1; TR-1, CP-3; LIB; PD)
HB – Jimmy Hitchcock, Auburn (AP-1; UP-2; CO-1; AAB-1; NEA-1; INS-1; CP-2; NYS-2; NYT-1; WC-1; FWAA; TR-1; PD; PM)
HB – Don Zimmerman, Tulane (AP-1 [fb]; UP-1; CO-1; NEA-3; INS-2; CP-1; LIB; NYT-1)
FB – Johnny Cain, Alabama (NEA-3 [as qb], INS-2 [as hb])

All-Southern team

The following includes the composite All-Southern team of coaches and sports writers compiled by the Associated Press.

References